Cem Anos de Rock n' Roll (Portuguese for "One Hundred Years of Rock n' Roll") is the fifth and last studio album by Brazilian new wave band João Penca e Seus Miquinhos Amestrados. It was released in 1990 by Eldorado.

Background
The track "Suga-Suga" would be included in the soundtrack of the telenovela Vamp one year later.

"O Escorpião Escarlate" was originally featured in the soundtrack of the eponymous 1990 film, in which João Penca also made a cameo.

Lulu Santos, in his second collaboration with João Penca, provides guitars for the short instrumental piece "Morceau".

Covers/parodies

Every João Penca album features Portuguese-language covers/parodies of old 1940s/1950s rock and roll/rockabilly and 1960s surf music songs.

"Papa Uma-ma"
A parody of The Rivingtons' "Papa-Oom-Mow-Mow".

"O Monstro"
A parody of The Contours' "Do You Love Me".

"Viver, Sonhar"
A version of Jerry Butler's "For Your Precious Love".

Track listing

Personnel
João Penca e Seus Miquinhos Amestrados
 Selvagem Big Abreu (Sérgio Ricardo Abreu) — vocals, electric guitar
 Avellar Love (Luís Carlos de Avellar Júnior) — vocals, bass
 Bob Gallo (Marcelo Ferreira Knudsen) — vocals, drums

Guest musicians
 Lulu Santos — guitars in "Morceau"

References

1990 albums
Portuguese-language albums
João Penca e Seus Miquinhos Amestrados albums